The Federal Correctional Complex, Tucson (FCC Tucson) is a United States federal prison complex for male inmates in Arizona. It is operated by the Federal Bureau of Prisons, a division of the United States Department of Justice.

The complex consists of two facilities:
 Federal Correctional Institution, Tucson (FCI Tucson): a medium-security facility.
 United States Penitentiary, Tucson (USP Tucson): a high-security facility with a satellite prison camp for minimum-security inmates.

History and facility
About 520 employees are required to staff the entire federal complex with additional labor provided by the minimum-security camp. The opening of the U.S. Penitentiary in February 2007 worsened a local shortage of prison officers, drawing some staff away from the nearby state prison complex operated by the Arizona Department of Corrections, also on Wilmot Road.

See also
 List of U.S. federal prisons
 Federal Bureau of Prisons
 Incarceration in the United States

References

External links
 FCC Tucson at the Federal Bureau of Prisons (Official site)

Buildings and structures in Tucson, Arizona
Tucson
Tucson